Oleksiy Serhiyovych Horbunov (born on 29 October 1961) is a Ukrainian film, television and stage actor. He has been named an Honored Artist of Ukraine (1991) and a People's Artist of Ukraine (2016).

Life and career
Oleksiy Gorbunov was born on 29 October 1961 in Kyiv. He spent his childhood in Rusanivka neighbourhood in Kyiv.

In 1978, immediately after graduating from high school he could not go to Kyiv Theatrical Institute because he was not a member of the Komsomol. In the years 1978 and 1979 he worked in the dressing room of the Lesya Ukrainka National Academic Theater of Russian Drama. In the theater, thanks to Ada Rogovtseva, he met with her husband, actor and his mentor Konstantin Stepankov.

In 1984 he graduated from the Kyiv National I. K. Karpenko-Kary Theatre, Cinema and Television University (in Konstantin Stepankov's course). Gorbunov began acting his first film, Unlabeled Cargo on the day he received his diploma.

From 1984 to 1995 he worked for Oleksandr Dovzhenko. In the spring of 1985 to 20 April 1987, he served in the Soviet Army.

In the 1990s Gorbunov worked as a private taxi driver because of the crisis at the Dovzhenko Film Studio. Director Vladimir Popkov helped him get back into cinema by inviting him for the role of Jester Chicot in the movie Countess de Monsoreau.

Gorbunov worked in the Theater Studio of Film Actor, in the private Chamber Theatre M. Nestantiner and Lesya Ukrainka National Academic Theater of Russian Drama. He starred in Ukrainian TV series Night Service (1998) and Wonder People (2008).

Gorbunov is a soloist of "Sadness Pilot" and worked as a DJ on the Kyiv radio stations "Continent" and "Nostalgia". He is also an organizer and presenter of two discos in Kyiv: "Dzhankoi" and "Jumanji".

Selected filmography
 1984 Vacation of Petrov and Vasechkin, Usual and Incredible as climber
 1990 Disintegration as Shurik
 1991 Oxygen Starvation as Golikov
 1998 Country of the Deaf as supplier
 1998 Countess de Monsoreau as Jester Chicot
 1999 Kamenskaya as Gall
 2003 Lines of Fate as Andrey Shurkov
 2005 The State Counsellor as Nikolai Seleznov / Rakhmet
 2006 Filipp's Bay as Booth
 2006 Dikari as Baron
 2007 12 as 9th Juror
 2008 Little Moscow as Major KGB
 2008 Stilyagi as Labukh
 2009 The Inhabited Island as Shurin
 2009 L'affaire Farewell as Choukhov
 2010 The 5th Execution as General
 2010 The Edge as Kolivanov
  2010 The House of the Sun as Boris Pavlovich Kapelsky
 2011 The PyraMMMid as Colonel
 2012 Moms as telephone cheater
 2012 Atomic Ivan as Ivan's father
 2012 Spy as Selentsov
 2012 Eastalgia as Zhora
 2013 Möbius as Korzhov
 2013 Khaytarma as Krotov
 2013 Shuler as Leonid Balaban
 2013 Sherlok Kholms as Professor Moriarty / The Cabman
 2014 Trubach as Vasily Petrovich, artistic director of the orchestra
 2014 Son as Father as Georgiy Teodorady, The Arbitrator of the organised crime
 2014 Leningrad 46 as The Musician
 2015 National Guard   as Oleksiy
 2015 Locust as Kavtorang
 2018 The Wild Fields as Pastor
 2021 The Last Mercenary

Television 

 2018 The Bureau (Le Bureau des Légendes), season 4 and 5 as Karlov

References

External links
 

1961 births
Living people
Recipients of the title of People's Artists of Ukraine
Ukrainian male film actors
Ukrainian male stage actors
Soviet male film actors
Soviet male stage actors